John Theodore "Theo" Rossi (born June 4, 1975) is an American actor and producer.  He portrayed Juan Carlos "Juice" Ortiz on the FX series Sons of Anarchy (2008–2014) and Hernan "Shades" Alvarez in Luke Cage (2016–2018).  His film roles include Tino Hull in Red Sands (2009), Todd in Bad Hurt (2015), Francisco "Ghost" Alvarez in Lowriders (2017), Deuce in Vault (2019), and Youcef in Emily the Criminal (2022), the latter of which earned him an Independent Spirit Award nomination.

Early life
Rossi was born in Staten Island, New York City, New York. He is of Italian, Spanish, Lebanese, Syrian, and North African descent. Growing up, he loved to ride dirt bikes. He has openly admitted to dealing drugs for years before moving to California. He studied acting at the Lee Strasberg Theatre Institute in New York, where he appeared in several theatre productions.

Career
Rossi played Juan Carlos "Juice" Ortiz on the FX series Sons of Anarchy. His production company, Dos Dudes Pictures, produced its first feature film in 2014, Bad Hurt, Rossi acting alongside Karen Allen and Michael Harney.

Rossi has appeared in television shows such as Law & Order: Special Victims Unit, Hawaii Five-O, Las Vegas, The Unit, Jericho, Bones, Without a Trace, Veronica Mars, NYPD Blue, CSI: Miami, Lie to Me and Lost. He has had recurring roles on Heist, American Dreams, and Terminator: The Sarah Connor Chronicles. His film credits include Cloverfield, Code Breakers, House of the Dead 2: Dead Aim, Red Sands, The Informers, Kill Theory, Fencewalker and Meth Head.

He played Hernan "Shades" Alvarez in Luke Cage from 2016 until 2018.

In 2019, Rossi joined the Advisory Board of the Harlem Film House, which presents the Hip Hop Film Festival, an annual event that focuses on filmmakers from the global culture of hip hop, and promotes financial sustainability for independent filmmakers from marginalized communities.

Philanthropy
Rossi gets involved with the men and women of the military, with fellow Sons of Anarchy actors Kim Coates, Dayton Callie and Ron Perlman. An Ambassador to the Boot Campaign, Rossi works with multiple organizations that raise money for wounded soldiers and those returning with post-traumatic stress disorder (PTSD). Throughout the off-season, Rossi has often traveled to different bases to visit US military personnel. He has helped to organize the yearly Boot Ride event that benefits the Boot Campaign, giving fans a chance to spend a day riding with the Sons of Anarchy cast while raising money for U.S. military veterans.

Shortly after Hurricane Sandy hit Staten Island, Rossi, with friends and family, founded Staten Strong, a program administered by the Boot Campaign. Staten Strong rebuilt three homes for Hurricane Sandy victims on Staten Island.

Rossi is a supporter of animal welfare and has been vegan since 1997. He launched a campaign with The Humane Society of the United States to protect street dogs. He appeared in a PETA ad promoting pet adoption.

Personal life

Rossi resides in Austin, Texas. He is married to Meghan McDermott. The couple's first child was born in 2015, and their second in 2017.

Filmography

References

External links

 

21st-century American male actors
American male film actors
American male television actors
Living people
Male actors from New York City
People from Staten Island
1975 births
University at Albany, SUNY alumni
American people of Italian descent
American people of Spanish descent
American people of Lebanese descent
American people of Syrian descent
American people of North African descent